Gerdil is a surname. Notable people with this surname include:

 Hyacinthe Sigismond Gerdil, CRSP (1718–1802), Italian theologian, bishop and cardinal
 Marcel Gerdil (1928–2012), French sprinter

See also 
 Gerbil (disambiguation)